"Body Next to Body" is a song recorded by Falco with Brigitte Nielsen. It was released as a single (credited to "Falco meets Brigitte Nielsen") in 1987.

Background and writing 
The song was written by Giorgio Moroder, Falco, and Tom Whitlock. The recording was produced by Giorgio Moroder.

Commercial performance 
The song reached no. 6 in Austria and no. 22 in West Germany.

Track listings 
7" single GIG 111 201 (1987, Austria)
7" single Teldec 6.15000 (1987, Germany)
 Side 1. "Body Next To Body" (4:18)
 Side 2. "Body Next To Body (The Other Version)" (4:16)
 		 	 
12" maxi single GIG 666 201 (1987, Austria)
12" maxi single Teldec 6.20835 (1987, Germany)
 A1. "Body Next To Body" (Dance Mix) (6:18)
 B1. "Body Next To Body" (Rock Version) (6:30)
 B2. "Body Next To Body" (The Other Version) (6:22)

Charts

References

External links 

 Falco meets Brigitte Nielsen – "Body Next To Body" at Discogs

1987 songs
1987 singles
Falco (musician) songs
Songs written by Falco (musician)
Songs written by Giorgio Moroder
Song recordings produced by Giorgio Moroder
Warner Music Group singles